This is a list of municipalities in Argentina which have standing links to local communities in other countries known as "town twinning" (usually in Europe) or "sister cities" (usually in the rest of the world).

A
Aldea Valle María
 Meinhard, Germany

Almirante Brown

 Isla Mujeres, Mexico
 Montevideo, Uruguay

B
Bahía Blanca

 Ashdod, Israel
 Chios, Greece
 Cienfuegos, Cuba
 Fermo, Italy
 Jacksonville, United States
 Reus, Spain
 San Isidro, Peru
 Talcahuano, Chile

Bariloche

 Aspen, United States
 L'Aquila, Italy
 Osorno, Chile
 Puerto Montt, Chile
 Punta Arenas, Chile
 Purranque, Chile
 St. Moritz, Switzerland

Buenos Aires

 Asunción, Paraguay
 Athens, Greece
 Beijing, China
 Berlin, Germany
 Bilbao, Spain
 Bogotá, Colombia
 Brasília, Brazil
 Cádiz, Spain
 Calabria, Italy
 Damascus, Syria
 Ferrara, Italy
 Galicia, Spain
 Guadix, Spain
 Guangzhou, China
 Kyiv, Ukraine
 Lima, Peru
 Madrid, Spain
 Miami, United States
 Montevideo, Uruguay
 Moscow, Russia
 Oviedo, Spain
 Rio de Janeiro, Brazil
 Santiago, Chile
 Santo Domingo, Dominican Republic
 Seville, Spain
 Tel Aviv, Israel
 Vigo, Spain
 Yerevan, Armenia

C
Chascomús
 Isla Mujeres, Mexico

Córdoba

 Andalusia, Spain
 Campinas, Brazil
 Castile and León, Spain
 Ciutadella de Menorca, Spain
 Cochabamba, Bolivia
 Córdoba, Bolívar, Colombia
 Córdoba, Nariño, Colombia
 Córdoba, Quindío, Colombia
 Córdoba, Mexico
 Córdoba, Spain
 Córdoba, Venezuela
 Florianópolis, Brazil
 Friuli Venezia Giulia, Italy
 Gyumri, Armenia
 Izhevsk, Russia
 Marín, Spain
 Montevideo, Uruguay
 Natal, Brazil
 Piedmont, Italy
 Santa Cruz de la Sierra, Bolivia
 Turin, Italy
 Valparaíso, Chile
 Xi'an, China

E
Esperanza

 Champéry, Switzerland
 Hérémence, Switzerland
 Riddes, Switzerland
 Saint-Martin, Switzerland
 Trient, Switzerland
 Vex, Switzerland

Esquel
 Aberystwyth, Wales, United Kingdom

F
Florencio Varela

 Chizhou, China
 Isla Mujeres, Mexico

G
General San Martín

 Alytus, Lithuania
 Civitanova Marche, Italy
 Maringá, Brazil
 São Bernardo do Campo, Brazil

H
Hurlingham
 Montevideo, Uruguay

L
Lanús
 Isla Mujeres, Mexico

Llambi Campbell
 La Cassa, Italy

Luján de Cuyo

 Bento Gonçalves, Brazil
 Mateh Yehuda, Israel

M
Mar del Plata

 Bari, Italy
 Benito Juárez, Mexico
 Fort Lauderdale, United States
 Isla Mujeres, Mexico
 Montevideo, Uruguay
 Punta del Este, Uruguay
 Rio de Janeiro, Brazil
 Saint Petersburg, Russia
 San Benedetto del Tronto, Italy
 Sorrento, Italy

Mendoza

 Nashville, United States
 Uriondo, Bolivia

P
Paraná

 Artigas, Uruguay
 Leonforte, Italy
 Rehovot, Israel
 Santiago de Cuba, Cuba

La Plata

 Anghiari, Italy
 Asunción, Paraguay
 Beersheba, Israel
 Bologna, Italy
 Boulogne-sur-Mer, France
 Chengdu, China
 Concepción, Chile
 Coro, Venezuela

 Jiujiang, China
 Louisville, United States
 Maldonado, Uruguay
 Montevideo, Uruguay
 Porto Alegre, Brazil
 Santa Cruz de la Sierra, Bolivia
 Shenyang, China
 Sucre, Bolivia
 Tabarre, Haiti
 Zacatecas, Mexico
 Zaragoza, Spain

Q
Quilmes

 Canoas, Brazil
 Colonia del Sacramento, Uruguay
 Isla Mujeres, Mexico
 Nanchang, China
 San Mauro Castelverde, Italy

R
Rafaela

 Fossano, Italy
 Sigmaringendorf, Germany

Ramona
 Villanova Canavese, Italy

Río Cuarto

 Abilene, United States
 Asunción, Paraguay
 La Carolina, Argentina
 Chillán, Chile
 San Rafael, Argentina
 Villa de Merlo, Argentina
 Vinaròs, Spain

Rosario

 Alessandria, Italy
 Almaty, Kazakhstan
 Asunción, Paraguay
 Bilbao, Spain
 Caracas, Venezuela
 Cuenca, Ecuador
 Dakar, Senegal
 Haifa, Israel
 Imperia, Italy
 Kuwait City, Kuwait
 Manizales, Colombia
 Medellín, Colombia
 Monterrey, Mexico
 Montevideo, Uruguay
 Piraeus, Greece
 Pisco, Peru
 Porto Alegre, Brazil
 Shanghai, China
 Santa Clara, Cuba
 Santa Cruz de la Sierra, Bolivia
 Santiago de Cuba, Cuba
 Santo Domingo, Dominican Republic
 St. Louis, United States
 Turin, Italy
 Valparaíso, Chile

Rosario de Lerma
 Lerma, Mexico

S
San Isidro

 Coral Gables, United States
 Herzliya, Israel

San José de Metán

 Brusino Arsizio, Switzerland
 Tarija, Bolivia

San Juan

 Coquimbo, Chile
 Isla Mujeres, Mexico
 Nerja, Spain
 Santa Catarina, Brazil
 La Serena, Chile
 Vicuña, Chile
 Xaló, Spain

San Justo
 Arluno, Italy

San Miguel de Tucumán

 Concepción, Chile
 Erfurt, Germany
 Nof HaGalil, Israel
 Sucre, Bolivia
 Santa Cruz de la Sierra, Bolivia

Santa Fe

 Braga, Portugal
 Cuneo, Italy
 Montevideo, Uruguay
 Santa Fe, Spain

Sunchales

 Arrasate/Mondragón, Spain
 Nova Petrópolis, Brazil
 Rivarolo Canavese, Italy

References

Argentina
Argentina geography-related lists
Foreign relations of Argentina
Cities in Argentina
Populated places in Argentina